The 14806 / 05 Barmer–Yesvantpur AC Express is an AC Express train belonging to Indian Railways – North Western Railway zone that runs between  &  in India.

It operates as train number 14806 from Barmer to Yesvantpur Junction and as train number 14805 in the reverse direction, serving the states of Rajasthan, Gujarat, Maharashtra & Karnataka.

It initially ran to / from  being subsequently extended to Barmer.

The train before had ICF rakes of Rajdhani Express that have converted into LHB rakes. The LHB rakes are more secure than ICF rakes in safety manners.

Coaches

The 14806 / 05 Barmer–Yesvantpur AC Express has 1 AC 1st Class, 4 AC 2 tier, 10 AC 3 tier & 2 End on Generator Coaches. In addition, it also carries a pantry car.
 
As is customary with most train services in India, coach composition may be amended at the discretion of Indian Railways depending on demand.

Service

As the average speed of the train is below , as per Indian Railways rules, its fare does not include a Superfast surcharge.

Routeing

It reverses direction of travel 5 times during its journey at Samdari Junction, Bhildi Junction, Palanpur Junction,  and Hubli Junction.

Traction

As the route is undergoing electrification, a Vatva or Abu Road-based WDM-3A locomotive hauls the train from Barmer up to  handing over to a Vadodara-based WAP-5 until  following which a Hubballi-based WDP-4D powers the train for the remainder of the journey.

Operation

14806 Barmer–Yesvantpur AC Express runs from Barmer every Friday reaching Yesvantpur Junction on the 3rd day.
14805 Yesvantpur–Barmer AC Express runs from Yesvantpur Junction every Monday reaching Barmer on the 3rd day.

References 

 https://web.archive.org/web/20140811094750/http://www.swr.indianrailways.gov.in/view_detail.jsp?lang=0&dcd=543&id=0,4,268
 http://www.thehindu.com/todays-paper/tp-national/tp-karnataka/extension-of-yeshwantpurahmedabad-train-sought/article5050891.ece
 https://web.archive.org/web/20140729155047/https://showyou.com/v/y-GKkapjkYo44/masculine-pune-wdm3d-hauls-the-last-run-of-ahmedabadyesvantpur

External links

Transport in Bangalore
Transport in Barmer, Rajasthan
Rail transport in Rajasthan
Rail transport in Gujarat
Rail transport in Maharashtra
Rail transport in Karnataka
AC Express (Indian Railways) trains